The Roman Catholic Diocese of Bata is a suffragan Latin diocese in the Ecclesiastical province of Malabo in Equatorial Guinea, yet depends on the missionary Roman Congregation for the Evangelization of Peoples.

Its cathedral episcopal see is the St. James and Our Lady of the Pillar Cathedral, dedicated to Saint James the Elder and Our Lady of Pilar, in the city of Bata.

History 
 Established on August 9, 1965 as Apostolic Vicariate of Río Muni, on territory split off from the Apostolic Vicariate of Fernando Poo 
 Promoted on May 3, 1966 as Diocese of Bata
 It enjoyed a Papal visit from Pope John Paul II in February 1982.
 Lost territories twice : on 1982.10.15 to establish the Diocese of Ebebiyín and on 2017.04.01 to establish the Diocese of Evinayong

Statistics 
As per 2017, it pastorally served 76,200 Catholics (69.3% of 109,910 total) on 6,681 km² in 18 parishes with 53 priests (35 diocesan, 18 religious), 105 lay religious (61 brothers, 44 sisters) and 9 seminarians.

Episcopal ordinaries
(all Roman rite)

Apostolic Vicar of Río Muni 
 Rafael María Nze Abuy, Claretians (C.M.F.) (1965.08.09 – 1966.05.03 see below)

Suffragan Bishops of Bata 
 Rafael María Nze Abuy, C.M.F. (see above 1966.05.03 – 1974.05.09 see below)
 Apostolic Administrator Father Ildefonso Obama Obono (1971 – 1975), without previous prelature; later Bishop of Ebebiyín (Equatorial Guinea) (1982.10.15 – 1991.07.09), Metropolitan Archbishop of Malabo (Equatorial Guinea) (1991.07.09 – retired 2015.02.11) and President of Episcopal Conference of Equatorial Guinea (2000 – ...)
 Apostolic Administrator Vicente Bernikon (1975 – 1976), while Bishop of Malabo (Equatorial Guinea) (1974.05.09 – 1976.09.14)
 Rafael María Nze Abuy, C.M.F. (see above 1980.06.26 – 1982.10.21), next Metropolitan Archbishop of Malabo (Equatorial Guinea) (1982.10.21 – death 1991.07.07) and President of Episcopal Conference of Equatorial Guinea (1983 – 1991.07.07)
 Anacleto Sima Ngua (1982.11.19 – retired 2002.05.11), President of Episcopal Conference of Equatorial Guinea (1992 – 2000), President of Association of Episcopal Conferences of the Central Africa Region (2000 – 2002)
 Juan Matogo Oyana, C.M.F. (2002.05.11 - ...), previously Bishop of Ebebiyín (Equatorial Guinea) (1991.10.11 – 2002.05.11); later Apostolic Administrator of Ebebiyín (2006.08.30 – 2011.02.19).

See also
 List of Catholic dioceses in Equatorial Guinea
 Roman Catholicism in Equatorial Guinea

References

External links 
 GCatholic.org - data for all sections

Roman Catholic dioceses in Equatorial Guinea
Religious organizations established in 1965
Roman Catholic dioceses and prelatures established in the 20th century
Roman Catholic bishops of Bata